Bahmayi-ye Sarhadi-ye Sharqi Rural District is a rural district (dehestan) in Dishmok District, Kohgiluyeh County, Kohgiluyeh and Boyer-Ahmad Province, Iran. At the 2006 census, its population was 8,348, in 1,491 families. The rural district has 47 villages.

References 

Rural Districts of Kohgiluyeh and Boyer-Ahmad Province
Kohgiluyeh County